

Events
2 January – Hey Hey It's Saturday launches in 1995 without Ossie Ostrich as Ernie Carroll, who was Graham Kennedy's on-screenwriter from the early IMT days, retired at the end of 1994. 
The whole year – Hey Hey It's Saturday Spin-off The Best/Worst of Red Faces had specials aired on 13 February, 15 May and 10 August
18 January – American sitcom The Nanny premieres on Network Ten.
24 January – Australian lifestyle series Better Homes and Gardens premieres on the Seven Network.
29 January - Network Ten launches a new on-air presentation package, with the slogan "Give Me Ten" which lasts until early January, 1997.
30 January – Australian current affairs programme Today Tonight airs on the Seven Network. The show will be launched with individual editions in each of Sydney, Melbourne, Adelaide, Perth and Brisbane.
6 February - The Seven Network's smash-hit puzzle show, Wheel of Fortune returns for the new year, with some changes to the new cash values on the Wheel starting from $100+. The changes to top Dollars were from $450 to $500 in Round 1, $750 to $1000 in Round 2 and $2000 remains the same. The Surprise Wedge is introduced on the wheel, where contestants spin up that wedge gets a letter, solves the puzzle for a major prize. The show has a new logo, revised set, theme muzac, with the audience-voice yell "WHEEL...OF...FORTUNE..." and John Burgess & Adriana Xenides were welcomed on-screen as 'Burgo & Adriana'.
10 February – Roger Climpson presents his final bulletin for Seven Nightly News after deciding to stand down after his diagnosis with prostate cancer. Ann Sanders replaced him the following Monday (13 February).
14 February – Australian drama series Fire screens on the Seven Network.
17 February – Australian children's education series Lift Off is back with a brand new series at 4:30pm on ABC.
20 March – Australian children's comedy series The Ferals return for a brand new series at 5:00pm every Monday on ABC.
24 March – Final episode of the Australian children's educational series Lift Off airs on ABC.
24 April – Australian comedy series which satirised 1970s-era U.S. police television dramas Funky Squad debuts on the ABC only running for 7 episodes.
24 April – The First Oz Lotto draw screened on Television starting on the Seven Network then the Nine Network in 2005.
1 May – Kerry Stokes becomes chairman of the Seven Network after reaching 20% ownership of the company.
29 May – Australian children's game show A*mazing returns to Seven Network for a brand new series.
29 May – Australian teenage game show Vidiot returns for a new brand series on ABC at 5:30pm with Scott McRae as presenter once again.
26 June – The ABC broadcasts the final episode of the Australian children's comedy series The Ferals at 5:00pm.
3 July – Australian children's television series Glad Rags premieres on Nine Network.
10 July – Network Ten debuts a brand new weekday morning children's cartoon programme called Cheez TV presented by teenagers Jade Gatt and Ryan Lappin.
20 July – Final episode of Australian teen game show Vidiot airs on ABC at 5:30pm with a special guest appearance by Andrew Denton.
24 July – Sale of the Century celebrates its 15th anniversary with a one-hour tribute special airs on the Nine Network at 7:30pm.
4 August – WIN Television axes its Regional Television News Bulletin in Albury. It is reintroduced nine months later.
4 September – Australian children's television series Bananas in Pyjamas begins airing in the United States for the first time when the series goes to air in Syndication with the word "pyjamas" being changed to reflect the American spelling "pajamas". The series was very popular in the country that it ran from 1995 to 1999 and even spawned a large range of merchandise such as books, toys and videos.
14 September – Australian miniseries Blue Murder premieres on the ABC in all states and territories except NSW and the ACT due to the life sentence of Neddy Smith.
15 September – Blue Heelers begins airing on RTÉ Television in Ireland for the very first time. The iconic Australia police drama series itself will start off airing on RTÉ One.
3 October – Australian game show Wheel of Fortune broadcasts, produces and airs its 3000th episode.
15 November – Australian children's television series Bananas in Pyjamas gets set to air in Malaysia on the country's already newly launched free to air television network MetroVision.
20 November – In Neighbours, Susan Kennedy and Brett Start arrive in Africa, 
26 November – The 1994 film Four Weddings and a Funeral starring Hugh Grant and Andie McDowell premieres on the Nine Network.
STW-9 is purchased by Sunraysia Television after a fierce bidding war with WIN Television.
1 December – Neighbours airs the 1995 season finale: Brett Stark and Susan Kennedy return from Africa, Annalise Hartman and Stonie Rebecchi sleep together and Sonny Hammond threatens Libby Kennedy.
Juanita Phillips leaves Network Ten to join new news channel services by Foxtel, Sky News the following year.
Pay television arrives in Australia with Foxtel & Optus Vision launching in the metropolitan areas & Galaxy & Austar launching in regional areas that year.
Anne Fulwood returns to the Seven Network in October to present its new late night news bulletin.

Channels

New channels
 26 January – Fox Sports
 26 January – ANBC
 3 March – Showtime
 3 March – Encore
 2 April – TV1
 22 April – Arena
 22 April – Max
 22 April – Red
 22 April – Quest
 19 September – The Movie Network
 19 September – Movie Greats
 19 September – CNN International
 19 September – ESPN
 19 September – Sports Australia
 3 October – Cartoon Network
 23 October – Nickelodeon
 23 October – Fox8
 23 October – fX
 4 December – The Value Channel

Debuts

Free-to-air television Domestic series

Free-to-air television International series

Changes to network affiliation
This is a list of programs which made their premiere on an Australian television network that had previously premiered on another Australian television network. The networks involved in the switch of allegiances are predominantly both free-to-air networks or both subscription television networks. Programs that have their free-to-air/subscription television premiere, after previously premiering on the opposite platform (free-to air to subscription/subscription to free-to air) are not included. In some cases, programs may still air on the original television network. This occurs predominantly with programs shared between subscription television networks.

International

Subscription premieres
This is a list of programs which made their premiere on Australian subscription television that had previously premiered on Australian free-to-air television. Programs may still air on the original free-to-air television network.

Domestic

International

Television shows
 Today Tonight (Seven Network)
 Better Homes and Gardens (Seven Network)
 This Is Your Life (Nine Network)

ABC TV
 Mr. Squiggle and Friends (1959–1999)
 Four Corners (1961–present)
 Rage (1987-beyond)
 G.P. (1989–1996)
 Foreign Correspondent (1992–present)
 Frontline (1994–1997)

Seven Network
 Wheel of Fortune (1981–1996, 1996–2003, 2004-beyond)
 A Country Practice (1981–1994)
 Home and Away (1988–present)
 Family Feud (1988–1996)
 The Great Outdoors (1993–2006, 2007)
 Full Frontal (1993–present)
 Blue Heelers (1994–2006)

Nine Network
 Sunday (1981–2008)
 Today (1982–present)
 Sale of the Century (1980–2001)
 A Current Affair (1971–1978, 1988–2005, 2006–present)
 Hey Hey It's Saturday (1971–1999)
 The Midday Show (1973–1998)
 60 Minutes (1979–present)
 The Flying Doctors (1986–1991)
 Australia's Funniest Home Video Show (1990–2000, 2000–2004, 2005–present)
 Hey Hey It's Saturday (1971–1999)
 Getaway (1992–present)
 Our House (1993–2001)
 Money (1993–2000)

Network Ten
 Neighbours (1985–present)
 E Street (1989–1993)
 Good Morning Australia with Bert Newton (1991–2005)
 Sports Tonight (1993–present)

Ending this year

See also
 1995 in Australia
 List of Australian films of 1995

References

References